"The Fringe" is the twenty first episode of the American television series Smash. It was written by Julia Brownell and directed by Dan Lerner. The episode premiered on NBC on March 12, 2013, the sixth episode of Season 2. In this episode, Derek reaches his breaking point and quits Bombshell, Kyle and Jimmy struggle to show Hit List at the Fringe Festival, and Ivy works up the courage to tell Terry what she thinks of Liaisons.

Plot

Production
There were four songs featured in the episode, three originals (one a reprise) and one cover ("This Will Be Our Year" by The Zombies). Of the originals, the show's in-house songwriters Marc Shaiman and Scott Wittman wrote "A Letter From Cecile" and the reprised "Never Give All the Heart", while "Heart Shaped Wreckage" was written by Julian Emery, Jon Green, James Lawrence Irvin and Lucie Silvas.

"A Letter From Cecile", "This Will Be Our Year" and "Heart Shaped Wreckage" were released as singles for sale from iTunes and Amazon.com's MP3 store. "Never Give All the Heart" is available on the cast album Bombshell.

Critical reception
Sara Brady from Television Without Pity gave the episode a C+ rating.

References

External links 
 "The Fringe" at the Internet Movie Database
 "The Fringe" at NBC.com

2013 American television episodes
Smash (TV series) episodes